Euplica scripta, common name : the dotted dove shell, is a species of sea snail, a marine gastropod mollusk in the family Columbellidae, the dove snails.

Description
The shell size varies between 9 mm and 22 mm

The oblong shell is subfusiform. The spire is turreted, conical and pointed. It is composed of seven or eight folded whorls, often tuberculated. The upper edge of each whorl is very slightly compressed, which renders the sutures but little apparent. The body whorl, with neither folds nor tubercles, is as large as all the others together, and striated at the base. The ground color of this shell is whitish, and there are delineated brown undulating or zigzag lines, more or less numerous, which descend from the top to the base of the whorls. Sometimes other bands upon the upper whorls form delicate rhombs. The aperture is rather narrow, attenuated at its lower extremity, and as long as the other whorls united. The columella is smooth, straight and entirely white like the rest of the interior of the aperture. The outer lip is indistinctly crenulated.

Distribution
This species is distributed over the entire Indo-Pacific and off Sri Lanka, Vietnam and Australia.

References

 Dautzenberg, Ph. (1929). Mollusques testaces marins de Madagascar. Faune des Colonies Francaises, Tome III

External links
 
 Hervier, J. "Le genre Columbella dans l’Archipel de la Nouvelle-Calédonie." Journal de Conchyliologie 46 (1899): 305–391

Columbellidae
Gastropods described in 1822